Shoshana Kamin (born December 24, 1930), born Susanna L'vovna Kamenomostskaya, is a Soviet-born Israeli mathematician, working on the theory of parabolic partial differential equations and related mathematical physics problems.

Biography 
Shoshana Kamin graduated from Moscow University in 1953 and earned her "candidate of science" degree from the same university in 1959,  under the supervision of Olga Oleinik.
She and her two sons left the Soviet Union in the early 1971. After that she became a professor in Tel Aviv University, where she is now professor emeritus.

Contributions
In the late 1950s, she gave the first proof of the existence and uniqueness of the generalized solution of the three-dimensional Stefan problem. Her proof was generalised by Oleinik.

Later, she made important contributions to the study of the porous medium equation,

and to non-linear elliptic equations.

Selected publications
. The earlier account of the research of Shoshana Kamin on the Stefan problem.
. In this paper and in the paper , the first existence and uniqueness proofs for the generalized solution of the three-dimensional Stefan problem are given.
. 
. According to  this is one of the most important papers in the asymptotic theory of the porous medium equation. Also, perhaps for the last time ever, she signed this work with both her present and former surnames, precisely writing "S. Kamin (Kamenomostskaya)".

See also 
Parabolic partial differential equation
Refusenik

Notes

References

Biographical references
. The "Mathematics in the USSR 1958–1967" is a two–volume continuation of the opus "Mathematics in the USSR during its first forty years 1917–1957" and describes the developments of Soviet mathematics during the period 1958–1967. Precisely it is meant as a continuation of the second volume of that work and, as such, is titled "Biobibliography" (evidently an acronym of biography and bibliography). It includes new biographies (when possible, brief and complete) and bibliographies of works published by new Soviet mathematicians during that period, and updates on the work and biographies of scientist included in the former volume, alphabetically ordered with respect to author's surname.

.

Scientific references
.
. 
.
.
. A comprehensive reference updated up to 1962–1963, with a bibliography of 201 items, including also a paragraph of 15 pages sketching the history of the subject

External links
Catalog RNB (in Russian)

1930 births
20th-century Israeli mathematicians
Jewish scientists
Living people
PDE theorists
Soviet mathematicians
Soviet women mathematicians